This is a list of the first minority male lawyer(s) and judge(s) in Alaska. It includes the year in which the men were admitted to practice law (in parentheses). Also included are other distinctions such as the first minority men in their state to graduate from law school or become a political figure.

Firsts in Alaska's history

Lawyer 

First Alaskan Native (Tlingit) male: William Paul:

State judges 

 First openly gay male: Victor Carlson in 1975 
First Alaskan Native (Tlingit) male: Roy Madsen in 1975  
First Hispanic American male: Rene J. Gonzalez in 1984 
 First African American male: Larry Card in 1993 
First deaf male: Charles "Chuck" W. Ray Jr. in 2012 
First Asian American/openly gay male (Superior Court Master): Jonathon Lack in 2007

See also 

 List of first minority male lawyers and judges in the United States

Other topics of interest 

 List of first women lawyers and judges in the United States
 List of first women lawyers and judges in Alaska

References 

American lawyers
Lists of people from Alaska
Alaska lawyers